Youngs Creek is a stream in Audrain, Boone and Monroe counties in the U.S. state of Missouri. It is a tributary of Long Branch.

Youngs Creek has the name of Benjamin Young, a pioneer settler.

See also
List of rivers of Missouri

References

Rivers of Audrain County, Missouri
Rivers of Boone County, Missouri
Rivers of Monroe County, Missouri
Rivers of Missouri